Jessa Khan (born 8 October 2001), is a Cambodian-Mexican-American ju-jitsu practitioner. She represented Cambodia at the 2018 Asian Games and claimed a gold medal in the women's 49kg ne-waza event. This was also the first gold medal to be received by Cambodia which happened to be unexpected in the sport of ju-jitsu during the 2018 Asian Games. Khan is a second Gold Medal Cambodia's Asian Games history after Taekwondo Gold 2014. She is a daughter of a Mexican American mother with Cambodian American  father. Her Facebook page says she took up jiu-jitsu at age 12 and shows her decked out with a vast array of her medals. She was born in Texas and resides in Southern California.

Her coach was Guilherme Mendes, BRA, from 2012 (Athlete, 28 Aug 2018). She also has her hero who can inspire her more such as; Brazilian ju-jitsu athletes Rafael Mendes, Guilherme Mendes, Luiza Monteiro, and Mikey Musumeci. On October 6, 2020, Khan was awarded her black belt in Brazilian Jiu-Jitsu by her coaches, the Mendes brothers, just two days before her nineteenth birthday.

Black belt career
On February 26, 2021, Khan made her debut appearance on Who's Number One, defeating Danielle Kelly by unanimous decision. She competed at Evolve Ur Game on April 3, 2021 in a superfight against Mayssa Bastos, losing on points. She returned to Who's Number One on May 28, 2021, defeating Patricia Fontes with an armbar. This performance earned Khan the invitation to compete for the inaugural WNO women's strawweight title at the WNO Championships. Khan submitted Jessica Crane with a heelhook in the opening round, but was submitted by Grace Gundrum in the semifinal with a twister and was submitted by Amanda 'Tubby' Alequin in the consolation match with a toehold.

In May, 2022 Khan became one of the first grapplers to sign a contract with ONE Championship. The promotion booked a rematch with Alequin for her debut at ONE 159 on July 22, 2022, but the match fell through when Alequin withdrew due to an undisclosed medical issue.

Khan competed in the 2023 Brazilian Jiu-Jitsu European Championship, winning a bronze medal in the women's roosterweight division.

Medals 
In 2017

 gold medal of European Championship
 gold medal of PAN American Championship
 gold medal of Las Vegas Open 2X
 gold medal of San Diego Open 2X
 gold medal of World Championship 2X
 gold medal of Long Beach 2X
 gold medal of Los Angeles Grand Slam
 gold medal of No ni World Championship 2X
 gold medal of JIU JUTSU World League 2X

In 2018

 medal of Los Angeles Open 2X
 medal of Tap Out Cancer
 medal of  Gracie National
 medal of JIU JUTSU World League 2X
 medal of  FIVE Gold
 medal of PAN American Championship 2x
 medal of  San Diego Open 2X
 medal of World Championship
 medal of American National Gi & No Gi
 medal of 2018 Asian Games

In 2019

 Purple Belt Champion🥇 at Abu Dhabi World Pro Championship

References 

2001 births
Living people
Cambodian female martial artists
Ju-jitsu practitioners at the 2018 Asian Games
Medalists at the 2018 Asian Games
Asian Games gold medalists for Cambodia
Sportspeople from Phnom Penh
Asian Games medalists in ju-jitsu
American sportspeople of Mexican descent
American people of Cambodian descent
Competitors at the 2019 Southeast Asian Games
Southeast Asian Games gold medalists for Cambodia